The Vintage Computer Festival (VCF) is an international event celebrating the history of computing.  It is held annually in various locations around the United States and various countries internationally.  It was founded by Sellam Ismail in 1997.

Purpose
The Vintage Computer Festival promotes the preservation of "obsolete" computers by offering the public a chance to experience the technologies, people and stories that embody the remarkable tale of the computer revolution. VCF events include hands-on exhibit halls, VIP keynote speeches, consignment, technical classes, and other attractions depending on venue. It is consequently one of the premiere physical markets for antique computer hardware.

Events
The Vintage Computer Federation runs VCF East (Wall Township, New Jersey), VCF Pacific Northwest (Seattle, Washington), and VCF West (Mountain View, California). Independent editions include VCF Midwest (metro Chicago, Illinois), VCF Europa (Munich and Berlin, Germany; Vintage Computer Festival Zürich, Switzerland), Vintage Computer Festival GB, and VCF Southeast (Atlanta, Georgia).

See also
 WinWorld

References

External links
 Vintage Computer Federation
 Vintage Computer Festival Midwest
 Vintage Computer Festival Europa
 Vintage Computer Festival Zürich
 Vintage Computer Festival West
 Vintage Computer Festival Archives- Past show notes, exhibits, photos

Computer-related events
History of computing
Computing culture